Elections for Ealing Council in London were held on 4 May 2006.  The 2006 United Kingdom local elections took place on the same day.

The Conservatives gained control of the borough from the Labour Party, who themselves had been in control since 1994. The Conservatives had campaigned on opposition to the proposed West London Tram, and this opposition was claimed to be a factor in the outcome, though Labour had incurred losses much further afield and the proposed tram would have run the length of the Uxbridge Road which only passed through about half of the borough's wards.

Turnout was 37.69%.

Results summary 
Out of a total of 69 seats, the Conservative party got elected in  37, whilst Labour candidates were elected in 27 seats. The Liberal Democrats were elected in 3 seats.

Ward results

Acton Central

Cleveland

Dormers Wells

Ealing Broadway

Ealing Common

East Acton

Elthorne

Greenford Broadway

Greenford Green

Hanger Hill

Hobbayne

Lady Margaret

North Greenford

Northfield

Northolt Mandeville

Northolt West End

Norwood Green

Perivale

South Acton

Southall Broadway

Southall Green

Southfield

Walpole

Notable results 
Leonora Thompson (Leader of Ealing Council) lost her Greenford Broadway seat after a recount.

Reactions 
David Cameron (Leader of the Conservatives at the time) stated, "It is obviously encouraging to win in an area where we do not have any members of parliament".

The new leader of Ealing Council said, "People in this borough are fed up with a council that wasn't listening to them on things like the west London tram."

References

Council elections in the London Borough of Ealing
Ealing